The Carson City Mint was a branch of the United States Mint in Carson City, Nevada. It primarily minted silver coins; however, it also minted gold coins, with a total face value in dollars nearly equal to that of its silver coins. The mint minted coins in 21 different years.

The Carson City Mint was created in 1863 but was not put into operation until 1870. It ran until 1885, went on a hiatus, and resumed operations in 1889, after which it ran until 1893, when it closed permanently. It is now the Nevada State Museum, Carson City.

History

Built at the peak of the silver boom conveniently near a local silver mine, 50 issues of silver coins and 57 issues of gold coins minted here between 1870 and 1893 bore the "CC" mint mark. The mint was established in Carson City to facilitate minting of silver coins from silver in the Comstock Lode, much as the San Francisco Mint was established to facilitate minting gold coins from the gold of the California gold rush. From 1895 to 1933, the building served as the U.S. Assay Office for gold and silver. The federal government sold the building to the state of Nevada in 1939. Coins struck here, especially Morgan dollars, are generally rare and command a high premium among collectors.

The building that housed the mint was the first designed by Alfred B. Mullett after becoming Supervising Architect of the Department of the Treasury. The construction supervisor was Abraham Curry, also known as the "Father of Carson City." The simple Renaissance Revival-style stone facade has pairs of round-headed windows and a center portico. It is now the home of the Nevada State Museum. Although the mint has not struck United States coins since 1893, Coin Press No. 1 (the original coin press from the mint) is still in the building and used to strike commemorative medallions with the "CC" mint mark. The most recent of these are medallions commemorating the 75th anniversary of the museum.

Proposed commemorative coin production 
On July 16, 2019, a bill was introduced proposing to strike commemorative Morgan and Peace dollars on the premises of the Nevada State Museum in 2021.  If passed, the coins will feature the "CC" mint mark, becoming the first legal tender coins to do so in 128 years.  Aside from adding a new date to both the Morgan and Peace dollar series, it would be the first time the Peace dollar is struck with the mint mark.

The bill has received support from many coin collectors, with the American Numismatic Association encouraging collectors to express their support.  However, some collectors have voiced their concerns about the mintage limit of 500,000 pieces.

Though 2021 Morgan commemorative dollars were struck with a 'CC' privy mark, they were not struck at the former Carson City Mint.

Denominations minted

Silver denominations 
Seated Liberty dime (1871–1878)
Twenty-cent piece (1875–76)
Seated Liberty quarter (1870–1878)
Seated Liberty half dollar (1870–1878)
Seated Liberty dollar (1870–1873)
Trade dollar (1873–1878)
Morgan dollar (1878–1885 and 1889-1893)
Note: A Seated Liberty dollar was the first coin to be struck at Carson City.

Gold denominations
Half eagle or $5.00 gold (1870–1884 and 1890–1893)
Eagle or $10.00 gold (1870–1884 and 1890–1893)
Double eagle or $20.00 gold (1870–1879, 1882-1885, and 1889–1893)

Photos

See also

 Historical United States mints
 The Dalles Mint
 Nevada State Museum, Carson City
 Carson City Coin Collectors of America

References

External links

 U.S. Mint
 Carson City Mint National Archives and Records Administration
 

United States Mint
Buildings and structures in Carson City, Nevada
Mints of the United States
Industrial buildings completed in 1870
Government buildings on the National Register of Historic Places in Nevada
Industrial buildings and structures on the National Register of Historic Places in Nevada
National Register of Historic Places in Carson City, Nevada
Nevada State Register of Historic Places
Nevada historical markers
Historic American Buildings Survey in Nevada
1870s architecture in the United States
Alfred B. Mullett buildings
Neoclassical architecture in Nevada
1870 establishments in Nevada